Salamandra is a genus of seven species of salamanders localized in central and southern Europe, Northern Africa, and western Asia.

List of species

References

External links

 Salamandra at Fauna Europaea
 
 Salamandra at Animal Diversity Web
 Salamandra at the National Center for Biotechnology Information

 
Amphibian genera
Taxa named by Josephus Nicolaus Laurenti